Strepsicrates melanotreta is a species of moth in the family Tortricidae first described by Edward Meyrick in 1905. This species is endemic to New Zealand.

References

Tortricidae
Moths of New Zealand
Moths described in 1910
Endemic fauna of New Zealand
Taxa named by Edward Meyrick
Endemic moths of New Zealand